This was the first edition of the tournament.

Jason Jung won the title after defeating Zhang Ze 6–4, 2–6, 6–4 in the final.

Seeds

Draw

Finals

Top half

Bottom half

References
Main Draw
Qualifying Draw

International Challenger Zhangjiagang - Singles
2017 Singles